The History Boys is a 2006 British comedy-drama film adapted by Alan Bennett from his play of the same name, which won the 2005 Olivier Award for Best New Play and the 2006 Tony Award for Best Play. It was directed by Nicholas Hytner, who directed the original production at the Royal National Theatre in London, and features the original cast of the play.

The school scenes were filmed in Watford in two schools, Watford Grammar School for Boys and Watford Grammar School for Girls. The film uses the uniform of Watford Boys. Locations in Elland and Halifax, West Yorkshire, are used to create the broader landscape of Sheffield in which the story is set.

Plot

In a boys' grammar school in Sheffield in 1983, students Crowther, Posner, Dakin, Timms, Akthar, Lockwood, Scripps, and Rudge have recently obtained the school's highest-ever A-Level scores and are hoping to enter Oxford or Cambridge, by taking a seventh-term entrance exam in History. The General Studies teacher, known to staff and boys alike by his nickname "Hector", is much beloved, and works alongside their deputy head and regular History teacher, Mrs Lintott. The Headmaster, known by all as "Felix", appoints a temporary teacher, Tom Irwin, to help the boys. Irwin states that he was at Jesus College, Oxford, when interviewed by the Headmaster. Prior to the entrance examinations, he says to Dakin that he was at Corpus (Corpus Christi College). Dakin discovers on his interview day at Oxford that Irwin did not attend. Irwin is only a little older than his students but proves to be a bold and demanding teacher, and particularly difficult to impress.

As part of their General Studies, the class acts out scenes from romantic films and literature. At the conclusion of each class, Hector offers a lift to one of the students on his motorbike and it is generally known (and initially dismissed as a joke) that he touches them inappropriately on the ride. The only one he never takes along is Posner, a slight Jewish boy, who doesn't hide his infatuation with Dakin. Dakin, who characterises himself as an aspiring lecher, is currently pursuing an affair with the headmaster's secretary, Fiona. He is not displeased by Posner's attention, but finds himself increasingly interested in Irwin. Gradually, Dakin's quest to impress Irwin on an intellectual level evolves into a flirtatious, potentially sexual pursuit of his young teacher, who is visibly attracted to Dakin. Meanwhile, Hector's indiscretions are shockingly revealed and Felix instructs him to "retire early".

The boys continue their studies and all gain places at Oxford and Cambridge, including the dimwitted Rudge, with Posner winning a scholarship and Dakin an exhibition (although both Felix and Scripps later refer to it as a scholarship). On the day they gathered at school on receiving their results, Dakin calls out Irwin on his lie of attending Oxford, Irwin admits that he studied at Bristol and attended Oxford only for a teaching diploma, then Dakin asks him out for a drink, overtly revealing his sexual interest in him, much to Irwin's confusion and repressed enthusiasm. They agree to get together that very Sunday. Dakin then proceeds to the Headmaster's office and, by threatening to reveal Felix's own sexual harassment of Fiona, forces him to reinstate Hector.

As the boys prepare to leave the grammar school, Hector, revealing that he is staying at the school, agrees to give Dakin a ride home on the motorbike "for old times' sake". However, before they leave, the headmaster runs out and stops them, saying that Hector should not take one of the boys. He suggests that Hector take Irwin instead. Dakin gladly hands the helmet to him, and the screen fades to white as they drive off, the boys waving happily and laughing.

A motorcycle accident occurs off-screen, and Hector is killed, although Irwin survives with a broken leg. Dakin (in voiceover) says that Irwin had never been on the back of a bike and so may have unbalanced Hector, causing the accident, and that he and Irwin never got a chance to meet that Sunday. The boys sing "Bye Bye Blackbird" at Hector's memorial service and the Headmaster gives a general speech. Mrs Lintott then turns and asks: "Will they come to my funeral, I wonder?" The school hall is shown with only the boys sitting and each recounts his life. Akthar is a headmaster, Crowther a magistrate, Timms a drug-taking dry-cleaning manager, and Dakin a tax lawyer. Lockwood, a junior army officer, was killed by friendly fire at the age of 28. Rudge is a builder, Scripps a journalist, and Irwin makes history TV programmes, though Mrs Lintott says they are more journalism. Posner is a teacher and takes the same approach that Hector did, save for the touching. The final shot shows the boys and teachers standing at the field trip lawn, with Hector's voice encouraging them to "pass it on".

Cast
Staff
 Richard Griffiths as Douglas "Hector", English & General Studies teacher
 Clive Merrison as Felix, the Headmaster and Geography teacher
 Frances de la Tour as Mrs Dorothy Lintott, History teacher & Deputy Headteacher
 Stephen Campbell Moore as Irwin, a temporary History teacher who encourages pupils to dissent from generally accepted viewpoints.
 Penelope Wilton as Mrs Hazel Bibby, Art and Art History teacher
 Adrian Scarborough as Mr Stanley Wilkes, Physical Education teacher
 Georgia Taylor as Fiona, school secretary

Students
 Samuel Anderson as Christopher "Chris" Crowther
 Samuel Barnett as David Posner, a Jewish boy who believes that he may be gay.
 Dominic Cooper as Stuart Dakin
 James Corden as Anthony "Tony" Timms
 Sacha Dhawan as Adi Akthar
 Andrew Knott as James "Jimmy" Lockwood
 Russell Tovey as Peter Rudge
 Jamie Parker as Donald "Donnie" Scripps

The majority of the main cast later appeared in Bennett's 2015 film The Lady in the Van, with de la Tour in a prominent role and cameo roles for Moore, Anderson, Barnett, Cooper, Corden, Dhawan, Knott, Tovey and Parker. Griffiths died in 2013, before The Lady in the Van was shot.

Reception
Richard Schickel of Time opined that the film is better than the original play. He explained that the transformation to film improved the "flow and intimacy" of the production, while preserving the messages it seeks to convey. Rolling Stone notes that some sense of familiarity with the subject of the film is lost in the cutting of nearly an hour from the original play, but the dialogue remains witty and pointed as is the customary style of the author. New York describes the film as "brilliant and infectious", and filled with Alan Bennett's customary deadpan humour.

Awards
The National Board of Review of Motion Pictures named The History Boys one of the Top Ten Films in its 2006 awards.

The film was nominated for the 2007 GLAAD Media Award for Outstanding Film – Limited Release.

Griffiths and de la Tour received BAFTA nominations for Best Actor and Best Supporting Actress, respectively.

Soundtrack

References

External links
 
 
 
 

2006 films
2000s teen comedy-drama films
2006 LGBT-related films
British teen comedy-drama films
British LGBT-related films
DNA Films films
Films scored by George Fenton
Films about educators
British films based on plays
Films directed by Nicholas Hytner
Films set in the 1980s
Films set in Sheffield
Fox Searchlight Pictures films
LGBT-related comedy-drama films
LGBT-related coming-of-age films
Films with screenplays by Alan Bennett
2000s English-language films
2000s British films